The Colombian Ice Hockey Federation (FCHH) is the governing body of ice hockey in Colombia.

History
The Colombian Ice Hockey Federation was accepted into the International Ice Hockey Federation (IIHF) on 26 September 2019. It was the fourth South American nation to join the IIHF after Brazil, Argentina and Chile, and therefore has no right to vote in the General Assembly. The current president of the federation is Daniel Fierro Torres.

National teams
Men's national team
Women's national team

Participation by year
2019

Colombia was not a member of the IIHF and therefore not eligible to enter any IIHF World Championships.

External links
IIHF profile
National Teams of Ice Hockey profile
Sitio oficial de la Federación Colombiana de Hockey Sobre Hielo 

Ice hockey governing bodies in South America
International Ice Hockey Federation members
Ice hockey